Silvia Bender (born 9 March 1970) is a German Green party politician and a State Secretary at the Federal Ministry of Food and Agriculture since 2019.

Life
Bender was born in 1970 in Bonn, West Germany.

She was appointed as the State Secretary in the Ministry of Agriculture, Environment and Climate Protection of Brandenburg in 2019.

In 2021 she became a State Secretary at the Federal Ministry of Food and Agriculture.

She announced that antibiotics given to animals had been reduced by 100 tonnes since the previous year in August 2022.

In 2022 she faced criticism from demonstrating farmers who were protesting in Bonn at the proposed banning of pesticides in certain areas. She said that these were EU proposals of which Germany was broadly in favour.

References

External links

1970 births
Living people
21st-century German women politicians
German agronomists
Politicians from Bonn